Autumn Equinox: Amethyst Deceivers is part three of the four part Seasons collective created by Coil.

Release history
This was first released on autumn equinox 1998 as a limited edition of 1000 7" on dark red vinyl and 40 copies on light blue vinyl. the cdep release was unlimited, but deleted on winter solstice 1998, when the last part of the solstice/equinox series was released. a second edition of the cdep was released on summer solstice 2001 and was limited to 400 copies.

This album was re-released on Moons Milk (In Four Phases). This album was to be re-released on the cancelled Moon's Milk In Six Phases.

Track listing

7" version
Side A
 "Amethyst Deceivers" – 5:09
Side B
 "Switches" – 3:11

CD version
 "Regel" – 1:16
 "Rosa Decidua" – 4:55
Featuring: Robert Lee, Rose McDowall
 "Switches" – 4:45
 "The Auto-Asphyxiating Hierophant" – 5:58
 "Amethyst Deceivers" – 6:37

References

External links
 
 
 Autumn Equinox: Amethyst Deceivers at Brainwashed

1998 EPs
Coil (band) EPs